Bechamoun, is an area near Beirut in the Mount Lebanon Governorate of Lebanon. It has an elevation between 40 and 580 meters above sea level, 8 kilometers from Beirut airport and Beirut downtown. Bechamoun's population exceeds 15,000.

Bechamoun was the first area to raise the Lebanese flag after gaining independence from France.

Name
Bchamoun's name is derived from “Beit Chamoun” (Arabic) The word comes from Syriac Aramaic spoken by the Canaanites.
, “House of Chamoun” (English), "Temple of Eshmun" (Syriac Aramaic), a Phoenician god.

Schools
Bchamoun has 10 schools, 8 private and 2 governmental.

Hospitals 
There is only one hospital in Bchamoun which is Bchamoun Speciality Hospital.

Archaeology
The site is located on the western terraces of a conical hill, west of the main village called Qalaa' Tahun-el-Haoua. An unpublished collection was also made by R. Saidah. Various potsherds were found and dated back to the Early Bronze Age by Maurice Dunand. Amongst the pottery was a sherd with a cylinder seal showing pattern of marching and alternating goats and lions that was similar to sherds showing a similar type of animalism from Byblos, Megiddo and other Palestinian and Syrian sites dating to the EB period. Although some thinner pink ware was found, sherds were usually red or grey, thick and well fired. The forms suggested were large, flat based jars with flared rims. Decorations found included incised patterns, made with combs to form bands of chevrons. Similar finds were discovered at Jaita I, Kaffer Jarra Roueisse, Nahr Damour, Aramoun and Khallet-el-Khazen. Two used flint blades were found along with part of a basalt object.

See also
 Druze in Lebanon
 Christianity in Lebanon

References

External links
Bchamoun, localiban

Populated places in Aley District
Druze communities in Lebanon
Christian communities in Lebanon
Archaeological sites in Lebanon
Bronze Age Asia
Prehistoric Lebanon
Ancient cities of the Middle East